The 2011–12 Samford Bulldogs basketball team represented Samford University during the 2011–12 college basketball season. This was head coach Jimmy Tillette's fifteenth season at Samford. The Bulldogs compete in the Southern Conference's North Division and played their home games at Pete Hanna Center. They finished the season 11–19, 8–10 on SoCon play to finish in a tie for third place in the North Division and lost in the first round of the Southern Conference tournament to Furman.

Roster

Schedule and results

|-
!colspan=9| Exhibition

|-
!colspan=9| Regular season

|- 
!colspan=9| Southern Conference tournament

References

Samford
Samford Bulldogs men's basketball seasons
Samford
Samford